Leigh M. Chapman is an American politician and voting rights activist who served as Acting secretary of the Commonwealth of Pennsylvania from 2022 to 2023.

Early life and education 
Chapman graduated from the University of Virginia, earning a Bachelor of Arts in American studies and history, and received her Juris Doctor from Howard University School of Law.

Career 
Chapman began her career serving as staff attorney of the Voter Protection Program at Advancement Project. In 2015, Chapman was appointed to be director of policy of the Department of State of Pennsylvania by Governor Tom Wolf, and served as Policy Director until 2017. Chapman later served as the senior policy advisor for Let America Vote, held senior leadership positions on the Leadership Conference on Civil and Human Rights, and served as the executive director to Deliver My Vote. In 2022, Chapman was appointed by Governor Tom Wolf to become secretary of the Commonwealth of Pennsylvania after Veronica Degraffenreid resigned to become a special advisor to the governor. Chapman was sworn in on January 8, 2022.

References

External links 
Pennsylvania Department of State profile

Living people
Pennsylvania Democrats
Secretaries of the Commonwealth of Pennsylvania
Women in Pennsylvania politics
Year of birth missing (living people)